Herschel Leishman Mosier (January 16, 1900 – October 13, 1979) was an American football and basketball player and coach. He served as the head basketball coach at West Chester University during the 1923–24 season.

References

1900 births
1979 deaths
Centers (basketball)
Colgate Raiders men's basketball players
West Chester Golden Rams athletic directors
West Chester Golden Rams football coaches
West Chester Golden Rams men's basketball coaches
People from Demarest, New Jersey
Basketball players from New Jersey
Sportspeople from Bergen County, New Jersey
American men's basketball players
Basketball coaches from New Jersey